Scott Squires is an American retired gridiron football coach and former player. He served as the head football coach at California Lutheran University from 1996 to 2006, compiling a career coaching record of 54–45. As the head coach at Cal Lutheran, Squires recruited both Dave Aranda and current Texas head coach Tom Herman. Squires later went on to serve as a special teams coordinator in the Canadian Football League (CFL), spending one year with the Edmonton Eskimos (2007) and two years with the Montreal Alouettes.

Head coaching record

References

Year of birth missing (living people)
Living people
American football linebackers
Cal Lutheran Kingsmen football coaches
Edmonton Elks coaches
Montreal Alouettes coaches
Pacific Lutheran Lutes football players